A merkin is a pubic wig.

Merkin may also refer to:

People
Hermann Merkin (1907–1999), American-Jewish businessman and philanthropist
Ursula Merkin (1919–2006), German-born, American-Jewish author and philanthropist
Richard Merkin (1938–2009), American painter and illustrator
Marvin Merkins, pseudonym for Jacques Scandelari (1943–1999), French film director, screenwriter and producer
Daphne Merkin (born 1954), American novelist and cultural critic
J. Ezra Merkin (born 1954), American money manager, financier and philanthropist
Michele Merkin (born 1975), American model and television host
Merkin Valdez (born 1981), Dominican Major League Baseball player

Entertainment
Merkin Muffley, a character in the British-American film Dr. Strangelove
Merkin, Mother of Spiders, a character in the comic The Sandman
A character in the cartoon Yogi Bear and the Magical Flight of the Spruce Goose

Other uses
 An internet slang for inhabitants of the United States
Merkin Concert Hall, Manhattan, New York City
Merkin Ball, a two-song single by the American alternative rock band Pearl Jam

See also 
 Mirkin, a surname